Norbert Schmidt is a former West German slalom canoeist who competed in the 1960s.

He won a three medals at the ICF Canoe Slalom World Championships with a gold (C-2 team: 1969), a silver (C-1 team: 1963) and a bronze (C-2 team: 1965).

References
Overview of athlete's results at canoeslalom.net 

German male canoeists
Possibly living people
Year of birth missing (living people)
Medalists at the ICF Canoe Slalom World Championships